Mazepa or Mazeppa is the surname of Ivan Mazepa, a Ukrainian hetman made famous worldwide by a poem by Lord Byron. It may refer to:

Artistic works

Poems
 "Mazeppa" (poem) (1819), a dramatic poem by Lord Byron
 "Mazeppa", a poem by Victor Hugo, part of the collection Les Orientales (1829)

Music, drama, film
 Mazeppa (1828), a piano work by Carl Loewe Op. 27
 Mazeppa (1862), a cantata by Michael W. Balfe to text by Jessica Rankin
 Mazeppa; or, The wild horse of Tartary, an 1831 hippodrama by Henry M. Milner
 Mazepa (drama) (1839), a drama by Juliusz Słowacki
 Mazeppa (1892), an opera by Clemence de Grandval
 Mazeppa (opera) (1884), an opera by Tchaikovsky
 Mazeppa (symphonic poem), an orchestral work by Franz Liszt
 Transcendental Étude No. 4 (Liszt), called Mazeppa, an étude for piano by Franz Liszt
 Mazeppa (1909 film), a Russian film
 Mazeppa (1993 film), a French film

People
 Mazepa family, a Ruthenian/Ukrainian noble family
 Ivan Mazepa (1639–1709), also known as Mazeppa, Ukrainian Cossack hetman
 Isaak Mazepa (1884–1952), Ukrainian politician
 Marina Mazepa (born 1997), Ukrainian actress, model, dancer, and contortionist
 Gailard Sartain (born 1946), American actor occasionally known as Dr. Mazeppa Pompazoidi

Fictional characters
 Mazeppa, a character in the 1930 film The Blue Angel
 Mazeppa, a character in the 1959 musical Gypsy and its subsequent screen adaptations

Places

United States
 Mazeppa, Minnesota
 Mazeppa, Pennsylvania
 Mazeppa Township, Wabasha County, Minnesota
 Mazeppa Township, Grant County, South Dakota

Elsewhere
 Mazeppa National Park, Australia
 Mazeppa, Alberta, Canada
 Mazeppa Bay, South Africa
 Mazepa, a neighborhood in Galați, Romania

Other
 Ukrainian corvette Hetman Ivan Mazepa, a ship of the Ukrainian Navy
 A South Devon Railway Eagle class 4-4-0ST steam locomotive